Johann Viktor Bredt (2 March 1879 – 1 December 1940) was a German jurist and politician. He served as Minister of Justice of the Weimar Republic in 1930/1.

Biography
Bredt was born in Barmen on 2 March 1879 as the only son of Viktor Richard Bredt (1849–81), an industrialist, and his wife, Henriette née Koll.

He worked at the Barmer Bankverein in 1897/8 before studying jurisprudence and economics at Tübingen, Göttingen and Bonn. In 1901 he was awarded a doctorate (Dr. jur.) and in 1904 a Dr. phil.. In 1909 he became a professor at Marburg. Bredt worked in the civil service in 1903-09 and in 1910 was appointed to a professorship for jurisprudence at Marburg university.

Johann married twice: in 1902 Ada Bredt (divorced in 1912) at Barmen and in 1931 Olga Bredt (at Marburg).

Political career
In 1911–8, and again from 1921-4 Bredt was a member of the lower chamber of the Landtag of Prussia, first for the Free Conservative Party in the Kingdom of Prussia, then in the Free State of Prussia. From 1924 to 1932, he was the parliamentary leader of the Reich Party of the German Middle Class (which he had co-founded) in the Reichstag. He also held various honorary and political positions on a local (Marburg) and regional (Hesse-Nassau) level.

In 1926, Bredt was an expert witness for the parliamentary committee on the causes of the German collapse in 1918. In 1930/1, he served as Minister of Justice in the first cabinet of Heinrich Brüning. Bredt also played a key role in the German reformed church. In 1925, he was awarded an honorary doctorate in theology Dr. theol. h. c. by the University of Bonn.

Bredt died 1 December 1940 in Marburg.

Works
 Die Trennung von Kirche und Staat, 1919
 Die Rechte des Summus Episcopus, 1919
 Neues evangelisches Kirchenrecht für Preußen, 3 volumes, 1921–27 
 Der Geist der deutschen Reichsverfassung, 1924
 Der deutsche Reichstag im Weltkrieg, 1926
 Die belgische Neutralität und der Schlieffensche Feldzugsplan, 1929
 Geschichte der Familie Bredt, 1937
 Haus Bredt-Rübel, 1937
 Die Verfassung der reformierten Kirche in Cleve-Jülich-Berg-Mark, 1938.

References

External links
 

1879 births
1940 deaths
Politicians from Wuppertal
People from the Rhine Province
Free Conservative Party politicians
Reich Party of the German Middle Class politicians
Government ministers of Germany
Members of the Reichstag of the Weimar Republic